Coalton may refer to a place in the United States:

 Coalton, Illinois
 Coalton, Kentucky
 Coalton, Ohio
 Coalton, Oklahoma
 Coalton, West Virginia